Giancarlo Danova (18 November 1938 – 15 June 2014) was an Italian football forward who played for A.C. Milan, Torino F.C., Catania Calcio, Atalanta B.C., Fiorentina F.C. and Mantova Calcio. During his career he played on three Italian Championship sides.

Domestic League Records

Honours 
Milan
Serie A:
Winner : 2
1958–59, 1961–62

Fiorentina
Serie A:
Winner : 1
1968–69

References

External links
Enciclopedia del Calcio profile

1938 births
2014 deaths
Italian footballers
Association football forwards
A.C. Milan players
Torino F.C. players
Catania S.S.D. players
Atalanta B.C. players
ACF Fiorentina players
Mantova 1911 players
Serie A players
Serie B players